ESA Vigil, formerly known as Lagrange, is a planned solar weather mission by the European Space Agency. In development is a spacecraft to be positioned at the fifth Lagrangian point, L5. From there it would get a 'side' view of the Sun, observing regions of solar activity on the solar surface before they turn and face Earth.

Monitoring space weather includes events such as solar flares, coronal mass ejections, geomagnetic storms, solar proton events, etc. Monitoring from the fifth Lagrange point would help predict arrival times at Earth and any potential effect on infrastructure. The Vigil spacecraft is anticipated to launch in the mid-2020s.

On 17 May 2021, ESA began soliciting design concept studies from various European industrial and scientific consortiums for the mission. A final design will be selected after approximately 18 months, in late 2022. Simultaneously, the ESA announced the No-Name Mission contest to replace the placeholder Lagrange name. The winning name, Vigil, was announced on 10 February 2022.

Overview

To ensure an effective capability to monitor potentially dangerous solar events, ESA is developing the Vigil satellite, to be located at Lagrange point 5.  The Vigil mission concept is overseen by the Space Situational Awareness Programme at ESA. On 2 February 2018, ESA signed technological contracts (Phase A) to be led by Airbus UK and OHB SE of Germany to design the spacecraft specifications and the instruments' integration process. UK's Rutherford Appleton Laboratory and Mullard Space Science Laboratory will assess the requirements of the science payload.

This mission concept initially proposed positioning two spacecraft in orbit at the L1 and L5 Lagrangian points, respectively, where gravitational forces interact to create a stable location to save propellant and from which to make observations. L1 is in the solar wind 'upstream' from Earth, so measurements at L1 provide information about the space weather coming toward Earth. In contrast, the L5 point provides a way to monitor coronal mass ejections (CMEs) from the 'side' in order to estimate their speed and direction. 

The SOHO mission already collects data at L1, but it is not able to deliver a constant data stream of sensor data around the clock like weather satellites do, which is needed for space weather forecasts. SOHO also is expected to end its service around 2025 due to a lack of fuel. There is however the Aditya-L1 mission of ISRO that fits the profile of the L1 mission very well and is scheduled to start in 2024. ESA has agreed to provide support by ESTRACK for this mission, and ISRO will exchange data with ESA to use it for space weather predictions.

Objectives

The preliminary mission objectives are:  
The spacecraft at L5 would provide a side-view of the propagation of plasma clouds emitted by the Sun toward Earth.
The spacecraft at L5 would monitor of the solar disk and corona and carry out measurements of the interplanetary medium.

Payload
To achieve these objectives, the Vigil satellite will carry different types of remote-sensing and in-situ instruments. The suggested optical instruments take heritage from ESA and NASA science missions like SOHO, STEREO and Solar Orbiter, but the instruments would be optimized for operational space weather monitoring. The notional science payload may require:  
Optical instruments
Coronagraph – for onset and characterisation of coronal mass ejections (CMEs).
Heliospheric imager (HI) – A wide-angle visible-light imaging system for the detection of coronal mass ejection events directed toward Earth. 
Magnetograph - would scan a selected solar spectrum  to generate 3D maps of the magnetic field.
EUV imager – Imaging of the complex solar corona (the Sun's atmosphere) will support monitoring of the magnetic complexity and activity in the corona and location of the flaring active regions.
X-ray flux monitor – Detection of solar flares and quantification of the flare energy.

In situ instruments
Magnetometer – Measurement of the interplanetary magnetic field.
Plasma analyser – To measure angular velocity components of the solar wind approaching the Earth and estimates of geomagnetic storm strength.
Radiation monitor – Monitoring radiation storms (Solar particle event) is crucial, as these can disrupt and damage spacecraft, aircraft and ground systems.
Medium energy particle spectrometer – This can monitor clouds of medium-to-low energy ions approaching the Earth.

References

Proposed space probes
2020s in spaceflight
Missions to the Sun
European Space Agency space probes
Solar space observatories
Solar telescopes